Glenrae is a rural locality in the North Burnett Region, Queensland, Australia. In the  Glenrae had a population of 83 people.

History 
Glenrae State School (sometimes called Glen Rae State School) opened on 16 March 1914 and closed on 1963. 

In the  Glenrae had a population of 83 people.

References 

North Burnett Region
Localities in Queensland